Joseph Bernard Wagner (April 24, 1889 – November 15, 1948) was a Major League Baseball player for the Cincinnati Reds in the  season. Wagner played second base and batted and threw right-handed. Wagner played minor league baseball for the York White Roses of the Class B Tri-State League. He was born in New York City and died in Bronx, New York.

References

External links

Cincinnati Reds players
1889 births
1948 deaths
York White Roses players
Portland Beavers players
San Francisco Seals (baseball) players
Spokane Indians players
Toronto Maple Leafs (International League) players
Montreal Royals players
Greenville Spinners players
Spartanburg Spartans players
Baseball players from New York City
Burials at Calvary Cemetery (Queens)